Euriphene schultzei, or Schultze's nymph, is a butterfly in the family Nymphalidae. It is found in Cameroon and the Central African Republic. The habitat consists of forests.

References

Butterflies described in 1909
Euriphene